Alfred Milward (12 September 1870 – 1 June 1941) was a professional footballer who played in the 1893 and 1897 FA Cup Finals for Everton and in the 1900 FA Cup Final for Southampton.

Early career
Born in Great Marlow, Milward was one of the first Southerners to establish himself in the Football League. The son of a tradesman, he was educated at Sir William Borlase's Grammar School and played for the school's Old Boys team and for Marlow, before joining Everton in May 1888.

A well-built, hard-working, determined and technically clever winger, he contested every ball, played at full stretch for the duration of the game and had a knack of delivering a cross-field pass to perfection from up to 40 yards, combined with his shooting power from wide positions.

Everton

League debut
Milward made his league debut as centre-forward at Leamington Road against Blackburn Rovers on 10 November 1888. Both teams had uniforms of similar colours: blue and white, but Rovers allowed Everton to wear their normal colours and came out in red and black jerseys. The match started at a frantic pace but neither side was particularly threatened. However, at one point Everton's right side struggled to cope with the Rovers' attack and Rovers exploited this to score. At half-time the score was 1–0 to Blackburn Rovers. In the second half, Everton had the sun behind them and started more aggressively. Everton's goalkeeper Robert Smalley had to make a good save to prevent Rovers scoring, but with the wind at their backs, Everton's play became flat and Rovers took full advantage scoring twice more, with the match finishing 3–0 to Blackburn Rovers.

1888–89 season
After their defeat at Blackburn in Milward's debut game, he was left out from 17 November until 29 December 1888. The new year of 1889 saw Milward back in favour, and he was picked to play at outside-left in the home match against Stoke City Potters where he scored his first League goal in a 2–1 win. Robert Watson made the pass and Milward shot past the Potters' keeper. The following week Preston North End were the visitors and Milward made his second appearance at centre-forward. From 19 January to 9 February, he played three games in a row, all at centre-forward. He missed the visit to West Bromwich Albion but returned at centre-forward for the final game of the season, a 3–1 home win over Blackburn Rovers. He scored his second goal in that match.

Milward played six matches for Everton where he scored two of his team's six goals. The team's 35 total goals scored that season was the second lowest tally by any League club. Everton finished eighth.

Later career
He quickly established himself and forced his way into the England squad, being one of five Everton players in the national team to play against Scotland in 1891. By this time Milward was noted as a hard-working outside-left at Everton and had forged a great partnership with Edgar Chadwick. Milward scored 11 goals in 22 games when Everton won the Football League title in 1890–91 and also won two FA Cup Runners-up medals before leaving Everton in 1897 and joining the newly formed New Brighton Tower club.

In 1899 Milward was enticed south to join an impressive-looking Southampton team who, despite being in the Southern League, boasted a star-studded side of experienced ex-internationals and former top flight players. With Milward in the side they surged past three top flight clubs in 1900 to reach the cup final, with Milward himself netting a brace to humiliate his former Everton colleagues in the first round.

On the day of the match, in-fighting between the English and Scottish players over the selection of one of the forwards caused a rift in the team that was evident in their easy defeat.

Milward died in Winchester on 1 June 1941.

Honours
Everton
 Football League championship: 1890–91
 FA Cup finalist: 1893 and 1897

Southampton
 FA Cup finalist: 1900
 Southern League championship: 1900–01

References

Sources

External links
Everton F.C. profile

1870 births
1941 deaths
People from Great Marlow
English footballers
England international footballers
Marlow F.C. players
Everton F.C. players
New Brighton Tower F.C. players
Southampton F.C. players
Gillingham F.C. players
Southampton Cambridge F.C. players
English Football League players
Southern Football League players
English Football League representative players
People educated at Sir William Borlase's Grammar School
Association football forwards
FA Cup Final players